Phnom Dei is a 272 m high hill close to Siem Reap, Cambodia.

Location
Phnom Dei is located to the southeast of the Banteay Srei, one of the major Angkorian temples, and south of Phnom Kulen. It is part of the temple complex in Angkor, the area that was the capital of the Khmer Empire.

Angkorian temple
There is a temple on top of the hill that was built during the reign of King Yasovarman I (889-910 AD). 

Phnom Dei is only one of the hilltop temples built during King Yasovarman I's reign, the others being Phnom Bakheng, Phnom Bok and Phnom Krom.

References

External links
Mercury diagram
Nick Ray, Cambodia

Mountains of Cambodia
Hindu temples in Siem Reap Province
Geography of Siem Reap province
Angkorian sites in Siem Reap Province